The Provincial Assembly (Pradesh Sabha) is the unicameral legislative assembly for a federal province of Nepal.

According to Article 176 of the Constitution of Nepal 2015, following the dissolution of the provincial assembly all the members forming the Provincial Assembly are elected. The term for the Provincial Assembly is five years, except when dissolved earlier.

Candidates for each constituency are chosen by the political parties or stand as independents. Each constituency elects one member under the first past the post system of election. Since Nepal uses a parallel voting system, voters cast another ballot to elect members through the party-list proportional representation. The current constitution specifies that sixty percent of the members should be elected from the first past the post system and forty percent through the party-list proportional representation system. Women should account for one third of total members elected from each party and if one-third percentage are not elected, the party that fails to ensure so shall have to elect one-third of total number as women through the party-list proportional representation.

A party with an overall majority (more seats than all other parties combined) following an election forms the government. If a party has no outright majority, parties can seek to form coalitions.

The first provincial assembly elections in Nepal was held in two phase on 26 November 2017 and on 7 December 2017.

There are 550 provincial seats in all of 7 provinces of Nepal. In which 330 (60%) of Provincial seats will be elected through first past the post and 220 (40%) of seats will be elected through proportional representation.

List of provincial assemblies

Seat distribution

Koshi Provincial Assembly

As per the Constituency Delimitation Commission report, Koshi Province has 56 provincial seats under the FPTP (first-past-the-post) across 14 districts.

Madhesh Provincial Assembly

Each district of Madhesh province has 8 provincial assembly seats, totalling to 64 seats under FPTP.

Bagmati Provincial Assembly

Bagmati has 66 provincial assembly seats under FPTP.

Gandaki Provincial Assembly

Gandaki has 36 provincial assembly seats under FPTP.

Lumbini Provincial Assembly

Lumbini has 52 provincial assembly seats under FPTP.

Karnali Provincial Assembly

Karnali has 24 provincial assembly seats under FPTP.

Sudurpashchim Provincial Assembly

Sudurpashchim has 32 provincial assembly seats under FPTP.

First provincial assembly election

The first provincial legislative assembly elections in Nepal were held on 26 November and 7 December 2017.

Notes

References

External links
 Constitution of Nepal, 2015 (2072)

Government of Nepal